is a system of payment for sumo wrestlers that supplements the basic salary that sekitori earn.  

This bonus is calculated using a fairly complex formula. When a wrestler enters professional sumo, he is credited with 3 yen. Every time he achieves kachi-koshi (more wins than losses) in a tournament, this value increases by 0.5 yen (or 50 sen) for each additional win over the number of losses (e.g. 1.5 yen for a 9-6 record). No deduction is made for a make-koshi record.

There are minimum values of mochikyūkin that are paid to wrestlers of different rank (jūryō, makuuchi, ōzeki and yokozuna), should they not be eligible for a greater amount already. If a wrestler is subsequently demoted, any amount awarded through these minimums in excess of that earned via the wrestler's win-loss record will be deducted again from the mochikyūkin account.  The minimum values for the respective levels are 40 yen for jūryō, 60 yen for makuuchi, 100 yen for ōzeki and 150 yen for yokozuna.

There are two ways to obtain a big jump in the mochikyūkin. Winning the makuuchi yūshō (championship) gives a bonus of 30 yen, which increases to 50 yen if the championship was won with a "perfect" (15-0) record. A maegashira will receive a 10 yen bonus if he can defeat a yokozuna during a tournament. Such a win is called a kinboshi (lit. gold star).

The value of the mochikyūkin account is multiplied by a predefined number to give the actual distributed monetary bonus, which is paid six times a year (once for each tournament) to the sekitori wrestlers; the current multiplier, since the year 1998, is 4000.

This means that, as an example, a kinboshi victory will be worth ¥240,000 per annum additional income for the remainder of the wrestler's career. Although he never won the makuuchi championship, former sekiwake Akinoshima won 16 kinboshi during his career, which gave him a mochikyūkin account that was larger than those of many ōzeki.

With its strong bias towards large kachi-koshi scores and top division championships, the highest mochikyūkin accounts are credited to the strongest yokozuna. Mochikyūkin accounts of over 1000 yen (corresponding to an additional income of 24 million yen per year) have been achieved by the very strongest yokozuna such as Taihō, Chiyonofuji and Hakuhō.

References

Sumo terminology